Glacier Norte may refer to 

Glaciar Norte (Popocatépetl)
Glacier Norte (Iztaccíhuatl)